Carmen Griffin de Lefreve was a Honduran politician. In 1957 she was elected to the Constituent Assembly, becoming one of the first female deputies in Honduras.

Biography
A prominent member of the Liberal Party in Cortés Department, Griffin was nominated as a candidate by the party for the 1957 Constituent Assembly elections. She was one three women elected, becoming the first female deputies in Honduras.

References

Deputies of the National Congress of Honduras
20th-century Honduran women politicians
20th-century Honduran politicians
Liberal Party of Honduras politicians
Possibly living people